Naugadh is  located in the city of Waidhan, Singrauli, Madhya Pradesh, India. It is 45th ward of Municipal corporation Singrauli.
The village has a senior secondary school named Gayatri that offers education up to Class 12.

References

External links
 Official website

Villages in Singrauli district